Carla Lasi (born 25 July 1965) is an Italian former freestyle swimmer. She competed in three events at the 1984 Summer Olympics.

References

External links
 

1965 births
Living people
Olympic swimmers of Italy
Swimmers at the 1984 Summer Olympics
Universiade medalists in swimming
Sportspeople from the Province of Ravenna
Mediterranean Games gold medalists for Italy
Mediterranean Games medalists in swimming
Swimmers at the 1983 Mediterranean Games
Universiade silver medalists for Italy
Medalists at the 1985 Summer Universiade
Italian female freestyle swimmers